Amatenango del Valle is a town and one of the 122 municipalities of Chiapas, in southern Mexico.

As of 2010, the municipality had a total population of 8,728, up from 6,559 as of 2005.

As of 2010, the town of Amatenango del Valle had a population of 4,661, up from 3,351 as of 2005. Other than the town of Amatenango del Valle, the municipality had 60 localities, none of which had a population over 1,000.

History
The territory of the municipality was originally settled during the Classic Period of pre-Hispanic Mesoamerica by a group of Tzeltal settlers. Their settlement, in 1486, was invaded  by Aztec troops under Tiltototl. In 1528, following the Spanish Conquest, an encomienda was established in the area.

References

Municipalities of Chiapas